Rafael Yuryevich Zangionov (born 5 August 1978) is a Russian former professional footballer.

Club career
He made his debut in the Russian Premier League in 2000 for FC Anzhi Makhachkala.

Honours
 Russian Cup finalist: 2001 (played for FC Anzhi Makhachkala in the Round of 32 and Round of 16 games of the 2000/01 tournament).
 Russian Second Division Zone Ural/Povolzhye best midfielder: 2004.

References

1978 births
Living people
Russian footballers
Russia under-21 international footballers
Russian Premier League players
FC Anzhi Makhachkala players
Russian expatriate footballers
Expatriate footballers in Belgium
FC Metallurg Lipetsk players
FC Sokol Saratov players
FC Gornyak Uchaly players
FC Zvezda Irkutsk players
K.R.C. Zuid-West-Vlaanderen players
Association football forwards
FC Spartak Vladikavkaz players
FC Neftekhimik Nizhnekamsk players
FC Spartak Nizhny Novgorod players